Woldemar Friedrich  (20 August 1846 in Gnadau, Saxony – 16 September 1910 in Berlin) was a German historical painter and illustrator.

Biography

In 1863, he began his studies at the Prussian Academy of Arts in Berlin, with Carl Steffeck. Two years later, he went to Weimar, where he continued his studies with Arthur von Ramberg, Charles Verlat and Bernhard Plockhorst. In 1881, he accepted an appointment as Professor at the Grand-Ducal Saxon Art School.

In 1885, he went to Berlin, to teach "drawing from life" at the Academy of Arts. There he continued to do decorative work, in the dome at the State Exhibition Building. In 1886, he was awarded a small gold medal at the Große Berliner Kunstausstellung. This was followed by a trip to India, after which he produced a series of watercolors and paintings, as well as an illustrated book, Sechs Monate in Indien, with text by "E. von Leipziger".

From 1898, he was a member of the jury delegated to choose designs for the trading cards issued by the Stollwerck chocolate company. His fellow judges included Franz Skarbina, Emil Doepler and Bruno Schmitz, who was a partner in the company.

He died in Berlin at the age of sixty-four and was interred at the Kaiser-Wilhelm-Gedächtnis-Friedhof in Charlottenburg-Westend. His grave has not been preserved.

References

Further reading

External links 

 More works by Friedrich @ ArtNet
 
 Goethes Leben: "Woldemar Friedrich's illustrations, presented as postcards, from the turn of the century"

1846 births
1910 deaths
German illustrators
19th-century German painters
19th-century German male artists
German male painters
20th-century German painters
20th-century German male artists